was a town located in Nishisonogi District, Nagasaki Prefecture, Japan.

As of 2003, the town had an estimated population of 7,577 and a density of 96.25 persons per km². The total area was 78.72 km².

On April 1, 2005, Ōseto, along with the towns of Saikai (former), Ōshima, Sakito and Seihi (all from Nishisonogi District), was merged to create the city of Saikai.

External links
 Saikai official website 

Dissolved municipalities of Nagasaki Prefecture